Kate Groobey (born 1979) is a British artist based in South Yorkshire and the South of France.

Early life and education
Biorn in Leeds, Yorkshire, Groobey was educated at the Ruskin School of Drawing and Fine Art, University of Oxford receiving a BFA degree in 2000. She then studied at the Royal College of Art in London, receiving am MA degree in 2008.

Career
Groobey exhibited in Newspeak: British Art Now Part 2 at the Saatchi Gallery in 2010,  the Bloomberg New Contemporaries 2011 at the ICA, in London and Surrreal at König Galerie, Berlin.

In 2014, Groobey was selected as one of a hundred artists for the book 100 Painters of Tomorrow.

Groobey was the first woman to win the Daiwa Foundation Art Prize in 2018.

Groobey's work has been written about in publications and essays including The Brooklyn Rail, NYC, by Alfred Mac Adam, 2017. The Daiwa Foundation Art Prize catalogue essay by Jonathan Watkins, Ikon Gallery, 2018.

Solo exhibitions
Assholes Of Ambition, RIBOT, Milan, Italy (2019)
Pure Pleasure, Atopos + Ikon Gallery, Venice, Italy (2019)
Pure Pleasure, Ikon Gallery Tower Room, Birmingham, UK (2018)
Daiwa Foundation Exhibition: Pure Pleasure, Mizuma Art Gallery, Tokyo, Japan (2018)
I'm Made Of Milk, Horton Gallery, New York, United States (2017)
The Good Life, Ever Gold [Projects], San Francisco, California, United States (2017)
Perfect Potatoes, Redling Fine Art, Los Angeles, California, United States (2016)
Perfect | Parfait, David Lynch Club Silencio, Paris, France (2015)

References

External links
 Official website

1979 births
Living people
Artists from Leeds
Artists from London
Alumni of the Ruskin School of Art
Alumni of the Royal College of Art
21st-century English painters
English women painters
21st-century British women artists
21st-century English women